Emanuele Romoli (born 20 March 1957, in Desio, Italy) is an Italian indoor rower and coach.

Rowing career
The first success in the practice of indoor rowing comes in 2001 with the victory of the gold medal at the Italian championships. In 2005 he returned to winning the national championship, which he will repeat uninterruptedly until 2012. In 2007 he also triumphs abroad with victories in the British Indoor Rowing Championships, in the French one and, above all, in the European championship, in which he conquered both the individual title and the relay title. In 2008 he took part in the CRASH-B Sprints winning the silver medal in the Lightweights Veteran Man 50–54 category.

In the following decade, national champion was reconfirmed (both at individual and team level) and continental, where, besides the European alloro, he also completed his palmares with four affirmations in the German Ergoregatta. Confirmed vice-world champion in 2013, just one tenth of a second from the time established by the Canadian Steve Roedde in the Lightweights Veteran Man 55–59 category. However, the world gold medal came in 2018 in the Lightweights Veteran Man 60–64 category, to which he followed a few days after the 12th individual Italian title.

In the 2018 season he achieved further victories at the BRIC, the 4th win at the Ergoregatta and further individual Italian titles on both distances, while between 2019 and 2020 adds a silver medal to the European championships in Prague, in addition to individual and team victories in the British and Italian championship.

During 2021, the year in which international competitions were held remotely due to the COVID-19 pandemic, the season opens with the third place at the MAIF Open France  and second place at CIRC, the Canadian Indoor rowing Championship. The most important victories of the year, however, are the second affirmation at the C.R.A.S.H.-B. Sprints in the lightweight category and above all the silver medal in the first edition of the new world championships.

Achievements

World Rowing Indoor Championships
 2021 –  Silver - Lightweight Men 60

European Indoor Rowing Championships
  Gold – Individual: 2007, 2012, 2013, 2014
  Silver – Individual: 2009, 2010, 2020
  Gold – Relay 4x500: 2007, 2012
  Bronze – Relay 4x500: 2020

CRASH-B Sprints
 2021 –  Gold - Lightweight Men 60
 2018 –  Gold - Lightweight Men 60
 2013 –  Silver - Lightweight Men 55
 2008 –  Silver - Lightweight Men 50

National competitions
  C2 Open Championship
 Individual - 2000m: 2001, 2005, 2006, 2007, 2008, 2009, 2010, 2011, 2012, 2017, 2018, 2019, 2020
 Individual - 500m: 2017, 2018, 2019, 2020
 Relay 4x500: 2008, 2012, 2014, 2018, 2020
  British Indoor Rowing Championships
 Individual - 2000m: 2007, 2012, 2015, 2017, 2019
 Individual - 500m: 2016, 2017, 2018, 2019
  Ergoregatta: 2014, 2016, 2017, 2019
  Aviron-Indoor: 2007

Other competitions
 National circuit Row Race: 2002, 2003, 2004
 World Ergo Head: 2008

Personal
Native of Desio in Lombardy, he grew up professionally in Trentino where he currently carries out his activity as an instructor in a.s.d. Prosport of Trento. He is recognized as an indoor rowing master trainer by Concept 2.

For the results obtained in the season 2007–2008, on 24 June 2008 he was awarded the San Vigilio d'oro per lo sport, an award given by the municipality of Trento for athletes who were able to stand out with their results sports in the national and international field.

On 4 April 4, 2019 he received from the president of the municipal council of Trento the Sporting Merit of the Municipality of Trento for the national and international competitive successes and for the activity of sport promotion in Trento.

References

External links
 

1957 births
Italian male rowers
Living people
Sportspeople from Trentino